Guapote is a vernacular name for several species of cichlid fish, including members of the genera:

 Parachromis
 Mayaheros